The AFL Women's season seven best and fairest award was presented to the player adjudged the best and fairest player during AFL Women's season seven. 's Ally Anderson won the award with 21 votes, becoming the second consecutive Brisbane player to win the award after teammate Emily Bates won the 2022 award. Having missed selection in the AFL Women's season seven All-Australian team, Anderson became the first AFLW player to win the league best and fairest award but miss All-Australian selection in the same season.

Leading votegetters

Voting procedure
The three field umpires (the umpires who control the flow of the game, as opposed to goal or boundary umpires) confer after each match and award three votes, two votes and one vote to the players they regard as the best, second-best and third-best in the match, respectively. The votes are kept secret until the awards night, and are read and tallied on the evening.

References

AFL Women's season seven
AFL Women's awards